Miroslav Bojko (born 30 September 1971) is a Croatian football manager and former player who currently manages Croatian Second Football League team HNK Vukovar 1991
.

Coaching career
After HNK Cibalia manager Samir Toplak resigned on 27 July 2019, assistant manager Bojo took over as a caretaker manager. He lost his first game the next day against GNK Dinamo Zagreb and later on the same day, Željko Kopić was appointed as manager for the club, with Bojko continued as the assistant manager. After Željko Kopić resigning on 25 November 2012, Bojko became the caretaker once again. Later, he became the permanent manager. He left the club in July 2013.

In the 2013–14 season, Bojko worked as a youth team coach for NK Novigrad.

On 17 May 2016, Bojko was appointed as the manager of NK Dugopolje. After three years at the club, he left on 10 January 2019. He took charge of Vukovar 1991 in November 2020.

References

External links
 
 
 Miroslav Bojko at Footballdatabase

1971 births
Living people
Sportspeople from Vinkovci
Association football forwards
Yugoslav footballers
Croatian footballers
HNK Cibalia players
HNK Vukovar '91 players
NK Ljubuški players
NK Široki Brijeg players
NK Marsonia players
Croatian Football League players
Premier League of Bosnia and Herzegovina players
Croatian expatriate footballers
Expatriate footballers in Bosnia and Herzegovina
Croatian expatriate sportspeople in Bosnia and Herzegovina
Croatian football managers
HNK Cibalia managers
NK Dugopolje managers
Croatian Football League managers